In mathematical analysis, the Agranovich–Dynin formula is a formula for the index of an elliptic system of differential operators, introduced by 
.

References

Elliptic partial differential equations
Theorems in analysis